France–Haiti relations are foreign relations between France and Haiti. Both nations are members of the Organisation internationale de la Francophonie, United Nations, and the World Trade Organization.

History

The first French to arrive to Haiti were pirates who began to use the island of Tortuga (northern Haiti) in 1625 as a base and settlement for raids against Spanish ships. In 1663, French settlers founded a colony in Léogâne, on the western portion of Hispaniola. After the Nine Years' War in 1697, the Spanish Empire ceded the western portion of Hispaniola  with the signing of the Treaty of Ryswick that same year. France named the colony Saint-Domingue. The colony was France's most productive and richest colony, and was made to grow primarily tobacco, indigo, sugar, cotton, and cacao. France used the labor of slaves from Africa, as a result of the near extinction of the Taíno people.

Independence

From 1789 to 1799, France underwent a revolution. The revolution in France had great implications in Haiti. In August 1791, slaves in the northern region of Haiti staged a revolt which would be known as the Haitian Revolution. In 1793, France sent as an envoy Léger-Félicité Sonthonax to maintain control and stabilize the colony from the revolution. In February 1793, Haitian leader Toussaint Louverture joined Spanish forces in fighting the French. In October 1793, Sonthonax emancipated the slaves in all of Haiti. In May 1794, Louverture left the Spanish army after they refused to free their slaves in the eastern part of Hispaniola.

In 1801, Louverture defeated the Spanish in Santo Domingo and emancipated the slaves of the territory. In 1802, General Napoleon Bonaparte sent 40,000 French and Polish troops to Hispaniola. Soon afterwards, Napoleon's brother-in-law General Charles Leclerc asked to meet Louverture to discuss terms. It was a deception and Louverture was seized and deported to France where he died in April 1803. After the death of Louverture, Jean-Jacques Dessalines stood as leader of the independence struggle and continued battling French forces. After the battle of Battle of Vertières in November 1803, France abandoned all hope of retaining control over the colony. On 1 January 1804, Dessalines declared independence for Saint-Domingue and renamed the new nation 'Haiti'.

France officially acknowledged Haitian independence in 1824.

Post Independence
In 1825, French King Charles X demanded Haiti reimburse and compensate France for the loss of money and trade from Haiti's independence. France threatened to invade Haiti and sent 12 war ships to the island nation. On 17 April 1825 an agreement was made between the two nations. France renounced all attempts to re-conquer Haiti and recognized Haiti as an independent nation after Haiti agreed to pay France 150 million gold francs in indemnity to the former colonists within five years. In November 1825 the first French consul presented his credentials to President Jean-Pierre Boyer. On 12 February 1838, a 'Treaty of Peace and Friendship' was signed between both nations.

Since the establishment of diplomatic relations between, both nations have signed several agreements and treaties, such as an agreement on commerce (1958); treaty on trade (1959); agreement on air transportation between both nations (1965); agreement on cultural, scientific and technical cooperation (1972); convention on the protection of investments (1973); cooperation on tourism (2007) and an agreement on joint research and of professional training (2015). 

Since independence, France continued to play an important role in Haitian affairs. Several Haitian Presidents ousted from power sought refuge in France, such as Presidents Jean-Pierre Boyer, Lysius Salomon, Franck Lavaud and Jean-Claude Duvalier. In December 1993, France asked the United Nations to tighten sanctions on Haiti after the removal of President Jean-Bertrand Aristide from power by the military in September 1991.

In February 2010, French President Nicolas Sarkozy paid a visit to Haiti, the first by a French President. During his visit, President Sarkozy promised Haiti €230 million Euros in aid after the island nation suffered its worst earthquake in its history. President Sarkozy also announced the cancellation of €56 million Euros debt owed by Haiti to France. In May 2015, French President François Hollande paid an official visit to Haiti and promised US$145 million in development projects within the island nation.

Trade
In 2017, trade between both France and Haiti totaled €69 million Euros. France's main exports to Haiti include: manufactured products, clothing, mechanical equipment, dairy products, and medicines. Haiti's main exports to France include: fruits and vegetables, beverage plants (cocoa and coffee), distilled alcoholic beverages (rum), ready meals, and spice plants.

Resident diplomatic missions 
 France has an embassy in Port-au-Prince.
 Haiti has an embassy in Paris and consulates-general in Cayenne, French Guiana and in Pointe-à-Pitre, Guadeloupe .

See also
 French Haitians
 Haitians in France
 Haiti indemnity controversy

References

 
Haiti
Bilateral relations of Haiti
Relations of colonizer and former colony